Mary Elizabeth Duffield, née Rosenberg (1819–1914) was a British flower painter and the wife of the still life painter William Duffield.

Life and work
She was born in Bath as the eldest daughter of Mr. T. E. Rosenberg, and became a painter of fruit and flowers. She was a member of the Institute of Painters in Water-Colours and married the still life painter William Duffield in 1850.

Duffield exhibited her work at the Palace of Fine Arts at the 1893 World's Columbian Exposition in Chicago, Illinois.

Her painting Yellow Roses was included in the 1905 book Women Painters of the World.

References

Bibliography

External links 

Mary Elizabeth Duffield on artnet
Mary Rosenberg in the ODNB

1819 births
1914 deaths
19th-century English painters
20th-century English painters
19th-century English women artists
20th-century English women artists
Artists from Bath, Somerset
English women painters